La Victoria is a district in Lima Province, Peru. It is bordered to the north by the district of Lima; to the east by the districts of El Agustino, San Luis and San Borja; to the south by the district of San Isidro; and to the west by the districts of Lince and Lima. From the hierarchical point of view of the Catholic Church, it is part of the Episcopal Vicariate V of the Archdiocese of Lima.

La Victoria is a historical and very busy public district located in downtown Lima.

Overview 
La Victoria has several sections: 
La Victoria proper extends from Avenida Grau in the north to Avenida Mexico in the south and from Paseo de la República Expressway in the west to Avenida San Pablo in the east. It is the most populous sector and it is filled with mom and pop stores, although Avenida Iquitos has a thriving auto parts sector. Gamarra Street is known in the entire city as a steady, if poor, clothier's row.
Balconcillo, immediately south of Avenida Mexico running toward Avenida Canadá, is slightly more residential, although it has some industrial offices, such as the local Ajinomoto and Xerox licensee offices.
Santa Catalina, running south from Avenida Canadá toward Avenida Javier Prado (marking the boundaries with San Isidro and San Borja districts) is the most residential and affluent section of all the district. It has been part of La Victoria since 1921 and was previously part of Miraflores (today it borders San Isidro).
The areas around the mountain (hill), Cerro San Cosme and El Pino, are completely integrated into the hills in the northeast part of the district. Sometimes they are counted as part of Victoria, but they comprise their own street. This sector is known as The Parade, from the nickname of the popular market products wholesale as well as several bus terminals located there now.
La Victoria is home to one of the most popular football teams in Peru, Alianza Lima. The Alejandro Villanueva Stadium is located near the housing project Hooch in the southern part of La Victoria. Today's La Victoria offers residents and visitors parks and cultural attractions.

History 
Until 1920, when it was made into a separate district, La Victoria was separate from Miraflores, Lima and Ate districts.

Industry began to grow in 1889 when the Italian Bartolomé Boggio and the American Enrique Price founded the Santa Catalina Fabric Factory.

With the arrival of migrants from the interior of the country seeking work in the capital, the capital's two economic centers – La Parada for edible products and Gamarra for textile products – were created.

District structure 

La Victoria is located south of the historic center of Lima. It is bordered to the north by the district of Lima through Miguel Grau Avenue and part of 28 de Julio Avenue; to the east by the El Agustino district through Cerro San Pedro, the San Luis district through Nicolás Arriola Avenue and part of Aviación Avenue, and the San Borja district through Luis Aldana Avenue and part of Canada Avenue; to the south by the district of San Isidro through Javier Prado Este Avenue and part of Paseo de la República Avenue; and to the west by the Lince and Lima districts through the entire Paseo de la República Avenue. The main roads in this district are Manco Cápac Avenues (the oldest in the district), México, Isabel la Católica, Parinacochas, Iquitos, 28 de Julio, Aviación, Nicolás Arriola, Canada, Nicolás Ayllón and part of Circunvalación Avenue.

La Victoria has a great commercial focus. The area of the district located north of Mexico Avenue is primarily commercial; in it the  stands out, which is the headquarters of the largest textile industry in Lima and has numerous stores, shopping centers and clothing workshops mainly in the vicinity of Agustín Gamarra Street. The food markets of La Parada and the Fruit Market also operate in this area. In addition, several commercial and interprovincial land transport companies have their headquarters in this sector.

To the south of Avenida México, residential areas of a medium-high socioeconomic level are predominant, such as Balconcillo and Santa Catalina. The first is characterized by its central park called Unión Panamericana and borders the avenues México, Parinacochas, Canada and Paseo de la República, while the second is characterized by its rapid real estate development which has increased the number of high-rise housing buildings.

Among its most important educational centers are the Pedro A. Labarthe, Felipe Santiago Salaverry, Sagrada Familia, Paul Harris and Isabel La Católica national schools. The first national school, formerly called Nuestra Señoras de Las Victorias, and the José Granda men's school, currently called República de Panamá, is located near the Plaza Manco Capac and is the oldest school in the district. There are also private schools such as América de La Victoria, San Ricardo, Reina de las Américas (Balconcillo), San Norberto (Santa Catalina), Nuestra Señora del Pilar (Santa Catalina).

The main Catholic church is Nuestra Señora de las Victorias, located along with the district municipality's headquarters in the central Plaza Manco Cápac, whose monument was donated in 1926 by the Japanese colony in Peru on the occasion of the centenary of Peru's independence. It also has other churches such as those of San Ricardo, in Matute (which has a public swimming pool), San Antonio María Claret, Nuestra Señora del Buen Consejo, San Norberto (consecrated on July 15, 1963, in the Santa Catalina urbanization), in addition to the Our Lady of Guadalupe Parish Sanctuary in the Balconcillo urbanization.

Additionally, La Victoria has a shelter for the underprivileged called Hogar de la Paz that is administered by the Missionaries of Charity.

A place of interest in the district is the Calvetti house located at the intersection of Hipólito Unanue and Iquitos Avenue.

Authorities

Municipal 
 2020–2022
 Mayor: Luis Gutiérrez Salvatierra, from We Are Peru (SP).
 2019–2020 
 Mayor: George Forsyth Sommer, from We Are Peru (SP).
 2015–2018
 Mayor: Elías Cuba Bautista, from National Solidarity (SN). (vacant) 
 Acting mayor: Harry Max Castro Durand (SN)
 Council members: Harry Max Castro Durand (SN), Víctor Primo Contreras Santa Cruz (SN), Augusto Valladares Sotelo (SN), Meuner Rosa Rojas Palacios (SN), José Luis Melgar Ramírez (SN), Mesías Máximo Gonzales Sánchez (SN), Renzo Herrera Granda (SN), Joaquín Reynaldo Albarracin Ramos (Peru Secure Homeland), Martín Jorge Luis Guevara Martínez (Christian People's Party), Marco Antonio Castro León (American Popular Revolutionary Alliance), Flor De María Fernández Ñique (We Are Peru).
 2011–2014
 Mayor: Alberto Sánchez-Aizcorbe Carranza, from Christian People's Party – National Unity ( – ; PPC – UN).
 Council members: Milagros del Carmen Manchego Bustíos (PPC – UN), George Patrick Forsyth Sommer (PPC – UN), Norma Yolanda Hoyos de Valcárcel (PPC – UN), Ismael Yucra Paquiyauri (PPC – UN), Irineo Félix Bonafón Arambuena (PPC – UN), Martín Jorge Luis Guevara Martínez (PPC – UN), Yheason Steve Nina Chipana (PPC – UN), Joaquín Reynaldo Albarracin Ramos (Radical Change), Julián Américo Chávez Luna (National Restoration), César Rafael Ibarra Nureña (We Are Peru), Olga Isabel Ramos Gutiérrez (Fonavistas of Peru).
 2007–2010
 Mayor: Alberto Sánchez-Aizcorbe Carranza
 Council members: Jesús Cesáreo Tan Kuong (acting mayor), Joe Zanabria Soberón, Jorge Luis Bartra Souza, Óscar Luis Labenita Carlín, José Luis Melgar Ramírez, Norma Yolanda Hoyos de Valcárcel, Irineo Félíx Bonafon Arambuena, Miguel Reynaldo Morales Porta, Martín Jorge Luis Guevara Martínez, Evelin Orcón Huamán, César Daniel Guerrero Díaz.
1929–1930 
Mayor: Manuel Augusto de la Torre Diaz; elected at 23 years of age.
 1920
Juan Carbone (First Mayor)

Police 
 Commissar: Cmdte. PNP Carlos Eduardo Díaz Quepuy.

Religious 
 Nuestra Señora de las Victorias Parish
 Priest: Humberto Eduardo Giusti Garro
 Nuestra Señora de Guadalupe Parish
 Priest: Rafael Reátegui Cabrera
 San Ricardo – U.V. Matute Parish
 Priest: Augusto Meloni Navarro

Festivities 

 November: Lord of Miracles

References

External links
 Alianza Lima
 La Parada
  Official district's web site

Districts of Lima
1920 establishments in Peru